The Social Progressive Party of South Tyrol (SFP) was a regionalist social-democratic party of German speakers South Tyrol that was active from 1966 to 1978.

It was launched in 1966 by Egmont Jenny, former leader of the left-wing of the South Tyrolean People's Party (SVP), and thanks to the support of the Socialist Party of Austria and its leader Bruno Kreisky. Its best electoral result was in 1968 when it won 2.4% of the vote, although not winning any seat in the Landtag of South Tyrol, while in 1973 it took 1.7% and got Jenny elected to the Provincial Council. The party, after having failed to merge with the Social Democratic Party of South Tyrol (5.1% in 1973) and even tried to form an alliance with the right-wing Party of Independents, it was disbanded in the late 1970s, with Jenny leaving the Landtag in 1978.

Electoral results

Provincial Council

Literature
 Joachim Gatterer, "rote milben im gefieder". Sozialdemokratische, kommunistische und grün-alternative Parteipolitik in Südtirol, Studienverlag, Innsbruck-Vienna-Bozen, 2009.

References

Defunct political parties in South Tyrol
Defunct social democratic parties in Italy